Harry Redhouse (27 March 1880 — 3 December 1959) was an English cricketer who played for Hampshire. He was born in Brompton.

Redhouse made a single first-class appearance, during the 1900 season, against Lancashire. Batting in the lower order, he scored a duck in the first innings of the match and just four runs in the second, the game finishing in an innings loss to Hampshire.

External links
Harry Redhouse at Cricket Archive 

1880 births
1959 deaths
English cricketers
Hampshire cricketers